Santo Antônio do Tauá is a municipality in the state of Pará in the North region of Brazil.

See also
List of municipalities in Pará

References

Municipalities in Pará